Southwest High School is a four-year comprehensive public high school located in the Linden Hills neighborhood of Minneapolis, Minnesota, United States. It is one of 10 high schools in the Minneapolis Public Schools district. Southwest offers the International Baccalaureate Diploma Programme.

History
Construction for Southwest High School began in 1938, and the school was opened in 1940, with the main entrance at Beard Avenue South and West 47th Street. The school drew 841 students from Minneapolis, Edina and Richfield its first year. Several additions were made to the original structure. The first, a second gymnasium and several new classrooms in an area later known as the "North" building, opened in 1956; additionally, Southwest became a 7-12 school that same year. The second, was an entirely new building that became Southwest Junior High and was connected via a single hallway, opening in 1968; the new building containing another gymnasium, a new library, and a pool. With the new gymnasium in the "East" building, the gymnasium in the original structure was turned into a 700-seat auditorium.

With the reorganization of Minneapolis schools in 1982, Southwest returned to just grades 9–12, with seventh and eighth graders going to Anwatin or Anthony Middle Schools. Most of the students who attended West High School were transferred to Southwest when it was closed the same year.

In 1987, the International Baccalaureate Programme began at Southwest. Currently, all 9th and 10th grade students follow the IB Middle Years Programme curriculum.

Also in 1987, Southwest High School was one of the first high schools in the country to stop using a Native American for its mascot and nickname. The Southwest student body voted to change the nickname of the school from the Indians to the Lakers.

In 1998–1999, the classrooms in the North building were enlarged to become science laboratories. This same renovation included more new classrooms, a new gymnasium floor, and bleachers.

In 2006, a new equipment and weight lifting area was designed in the vocational north end of the main building. Over the next few years, the entire interior structure of the auditorium was removed starting with the concrete floor and ending with the new roof. The original stage and part of the original gym floor, now the orchestra pit, are all that remain of the previous structure. A new audio-video control booth, catwalks, seating, and acoustic walls were added, as well.

In 2016, the Minneapolis school board approved a $47+ million renovation which would add a new building and let the school have space for 450 new students. The renovation was completed for the 2016–17 school year and added 20 new classrooms to the school building. The new 60,346 square foot building was constructed between the original east (Southwest Junior High building) and west buildings. As a part of the renovation, 12,400 square feet of the east building was demolished. The main offices of the school were moved to the new structure, and a large part of the 60,346 square foot building was the new 10,000 square foot lunch room. The renovation also included mechanical upgrades like air conditioning that classrooms in the school had never had before.

Controversies and incidents
On March 2, 2018, there were several fights between students during the school's lunch period. School officials had known of the possibility and administrators had reached out to the students every hour beforehand to no avail. The police were not called, but fifteen school resource officers from other schools were brought in for backup.

On March 14, 2018, exactly one month after the Stoneman Douglas High School shooting in Parkland, Florida, students at Southwest participated in a nationwide walkout to honor the victims of the shooting and protest gun violence. During the walkout a student across the street from campus waved a "Trump" flag. Eight students confronted him, taking his flag and assaulting him. The student sustained minor injuries and a camera he was holding was damaged. Minneapolis Police stated that a school resource officer stopped the confrontation.

Demographics
The demographic breakdown of the 1,918 students enrolled in 2021-2022 was:
Male – 51%
Female – 49%
Native American/Alaskan – 0.7%
Asian/Pacific islanders – 3.7%
Black – 26.7%
Hispanic – 10.2%
White – 56.2%
Multiracial – 2.5%

33% of the students were eligible for free or reduced cost lunch. This is a Title I school.

Notable alumni

 Dorothy Benham – Miss America 1977
 Tom Chorske – professional ice hockey player
 Dessa Darling – hip hop artist, poet, writer
 Peter Graves – actor
 Dylan Keefe – bass guitarist of Marcy Playground
 Libby Larsen - Grammy Award-winning composer
 Dave Peterson (1955–1984), business teacher, high school hockey coach, and coach of the United States men's national ice hockey team
 Ken Rizer – Iowa state representative
 Marion Ross – actress
 Matthew Santos – musician
 Palbasha Siddique – singer
 Matt Smaby – professional ice hockey player
 Jake Sullivan – National Security Advisor for President Joe Biden
 John Taft – professional ice hockey player
 Lizz Winstead – comedian, Daily Show co-creator

References

External links

Southwest Foundation
Southwest Athletic Hall of Fame

High schools in Minneapolis
International Baccalaureate schools in Minnesota
Minneapolis Public Schools
Educational institutions established in 1940
Public high schools in Minnesota
1940 establishments in Minnesota